Destry "D-Train" Wright (born July 9, 1977) is a retired American football player.

At Jackson State, Wright set the team's three-season career rushing record of 4,020 yards, running for 1,614 yards and scoring 12 touchdowns in his last season.  Wright also held the record as the Southwestern Athletic Conference’s all-time leading rusher.

As an un-drafted free agent, Wright "officially" played one season with the Pittsburgh Steelers, though he was unable to play any regular-season games due to an injury suffered in a pre-season game against the Dallas Cowboys on July 30, 2000, in which Wright dislocated his right ankle and broke his right leg. The injury gained widespread publicity after an on-field photo was published that showed Wright's feet pointing in different directions.
He is now a middle school football coach at Cordova Middle School in Cordova, Tennessee.

References

1977 births
Living people
African-American players of American football
Players of American football from Mississippi
Sportspeople from Clarksdale, Mississippi
Jackson State Tigers football players
American football running backs
21st-century African-American sportspeople
20th-century African-American sportspeople
Pittsburgh Steelers players